Translational Neurodegeneration is a peer-reviewed medical journal covering the field of neurodegenerative diseases, such as Parkinson's and Alzheimer's disease. It was established in 2012 and is published by BioMed Central. The editor-in-chief is Shengdi Chen (School of Medicine, Shanghai Jiao Tong University).

Abstracting and indexing
The journal is abstracted and indexed in Chemical Abstracts Service and Scopus.

References

External links 
 

Publications established in 2012
Neurology journals
BioMed Central academic journals
English-language journals
Creative Commons Attribution-licensed journals